Junglee may refer to:
Junglee (1961 film), an Indian film
Junglee (2009 film), a Kannada-language Indian film
Junglee (2019 film), a Hindi-language Indian film
Junglee.com, a defunct e-commerce website by Amazon.com
Junglee, an Indian music label by Times Music